Crown Point High School (CPHS) is a 9-12 public school located in Crown Point, Indiana, United States. It is the only high school in the Crown Point Community School Corporation.

Academics
CPHS is accredited by AdvancED. For the 2021-2022 school year, Crown Point was ranked 2,059 nationally and 26 in Indiana in U.S. News & World Reports annual school rankings.

Demographics
The demographic breakdown of the 2,942 students enrolled in the 2021-2022 school year was as follows:
Male - 50.4%
Female - 49.6%
Native American - 0.2%
Asian/Pacific islander - 3.0%
Black - 3.16%
Hispanic - 14.24%
White - 76.2%
Multiracial - 3.16%

19.1% of students were eligible for free or reduced cost lunch.

Athletics
The Crown Point Bulldogs compete in the Duneland Athletic Conference. The school colors are red and white.  The following IHSAA sanctioned sports are offered:

American football (boys')
Baseball (boys')
Basketball (boys' and girls')
Girls state champions - 1984, 1985, 2021 (4A)
Cross country (boys' and girls')
Golf (boys' and girls')
Gymnastics (girls')
State champions - 2022
Soccer (boys' and girls')
Boys state champions - 2011 (2A), 2013 (2A)
Softball (girls')
State champions - 2017 (4A)
Swimming (boys' and girls')
Tennis (boys' and girls')
Boys state champions - 1972
Track (boys' and girls')
Volleyball (boys and girls')
Wrestling (boys')
State champions - 2009, 2022, 2023

Notable alumni
Spike Albrecht - former player for the Michigan Wolverines men's basketball and Purdue Boilermakers men's basketball teams
Austin Holloway - actor
Bay Kurtz - Virginia Cavaliers men's soccer player
Tre Manchester - film producer and director
Dan Plesac - former professional baseball player, baseball analyst on MLB Network
Zach Plesac - pitcher for the Cleveland Guardians
Jerry L. Ross - astronaut
Geoffrey G. Slaughter - Indiana Supreme Court justice
Sasha Stefanovic - Former Purdue Boilermakers Men’s Basketball Guard

See also
 List of high schools in Indiana

References

External links
CPHS website
Crown Point Community School Corporation

Public high schools in Indiana